Jeffery K. Taubenberger (born 1961 in Landstuhl, Germany) is an American virologist. With Ann Reid, he was the first to sequence the genome of the influenza virus which caused the 1918 pandemic of Spanish flu.  He is Chief of the Viral Pathogenesis and Evolution Section, Laboratory of Infectious Diseases, National Institute of Allergy and Infectious Diseases, National Institutes of Health. Taubenberger's laboratory studies a number of viruses, including influenza A viruses (IAVs), which are the pathogens that cause yearly flu epidemics and have caused periodic pandemics, such as the 1968 outbreak that killed an estimated one million people.  His research aims to inform public health strategies on several important aspects of flu: seasonal flu; avian flu, which circulates among birds and has infected humans in the past; swine flu, which circulates among pigs and has infected humans in the past; and pandemic flu, which can arise from numerous sources and spread quickly because humans have little to no immunity to it.

Training 
Taubenberger was born in Germany, the third son of an Army officer. When he was nine he moved to a suburb of Washington, D.C. with his parents after his father was posted at the Pentagon. He completed a combined M.D. (1986) and Ph.D. (1987) at the Medical College of Virginia in Richmond in a course designed for students who wanted to follow a career in medical research. For his thesis he studied how stem cells of the bone marrow differentiate into the mature cells of the white blood cell system. In 1988 he began a training to become a pathologist at the National Cancer Institute of the National Institutes of Health. In 1993 he was recruited to start a new lab at the Armed Forces Institute of Pathology (AFIP) in order to apply the then current molecular techniques to the Institute's pathology work. After a year he was promoted to chief of the Division of Molecular Pathology. This included a research lab, where he was free to pursue questions of basic science.

The AFIP was one of more than a dozen tenant facilities located on the campus of the Walter Reed Army Medical Center in the north-east of Washington, so its director reported to the Surgeon General of the Army and not to the commander at Walter Reed. It had originally been established by a Civil War general as the Army Medical Museum in 1862 to combat “diseases of the battlefield”. Before AFIP closed in 2011 as a result of the 2005 Base Realignment and Closure Act, the pathology division acted most of its time as a consultant, giving second opinions free of charge to the military and for a fee to civilian physicians. It handled tens of thousands of cases yearly on the understanding that it may keep a representative sample from any case. In this way it had collected tissue samples of some 2,600,000 people from surgical and autopsy material, mostly in the form of dice-sized pieces of tissue fixed in formalin and embedded in wax blocks of paraffin.

A dolphin disease 
The AFIP also worked on veterinary diseases. In the winter of 1987 half the population of bottlenosed dolphins along the Atlantic seaboard of the United States died of a mysterious disease. From samples taken from washed up dolphins a veterinary pathologist at the AFIP suspected a viral infection. In 1991 Albert Osterhaus managed to isolate a morbillivirus from dolphins who fell victim to a similar disease in the Mediterranean, but the samples from the first die-off were considered to be too degraded to isolate any viruses. Nevertheless, Taubenberger was asked to give it a try.

In the late 1980s Kary Mullis had found a way to duplicate DNA strands by a technique called Polymerase Chain Reaction (PCR). Using this method molecular biologist Amy Krafft eventually managed to isolate fragments of morbillivirus RNA. Here, the team perfected the techniques to extract RNA by PCR from highly degraded tissue (If you set out with an anti-sense RNA strand – as is the case with influenza or morbilliviruses – you first have to copy it back into a sense DNA strand).

In search of the 1918 Spanish influenza virus 
Fearing government cutbacks Taubenberger looked for an application of PCR to the immense warehouse of tissue samples at the AFIP. He eventually settled on finding remains of the flu virus, which caused the 1918 "Spanish flu". The warehouse stored wax blocks from seventy-seven soldiers, who had died in the pandemic. Taubenberger's team searched for samples of victims who had succumbed to the initial viral infection and not the subsequent bacterial pneumonia. Seven samples seemed promising.

The genome of the flu virus includes about 13,000 base pairs, which had decayed into pieces as small as 100 base pairs. In order to make PCR work, primers have to be constructed, i.e. a short bit of DNA with mirror sequences of the sequence at the two end points of the fragment. They bind to the fragment, and with the help of a polymerase bases are added between the primers to make a copy. The millions of copies of the gene segment are labelled with a radioactive probe as they are being made. They can then be separated on a thin gel by running an electric current across the gel. The radioactive labels create a black mark on an X-ray film which is put over the gel.

From serum tests of people who had witnessed the Spanish flu it was known that the virus had to belong to the H1N1 subtype. The team looked at all available sequences of influenza genes of this subtype to find out whether there were any parts of a given gene which were virtually identical. These were turned into primers. The first aim was to clarify whether any fragments of the flu virus were left in the tissue samples at all. The laboratory work was mostly done by Ann Reid and for more than a year she did not find anything. On 23 July 1996 Amy Krafft, whom she had turned to for help, got a positive result on a case from the 1957 influenza pandemic. That success led Reid to test more cases from 1918, with an eventual positive signal from tissue belonging to an army private named Roscoe Vaughan, who had died on 26 September 1918 at Camp Jackson, South Carolina from a pneumonia of the left lung. His right lung seems to have been a few days behind in the progression of the disease, so that the virus was still present on this side when he died.

The sequence of a matrix gene did not match any known sequence exactly, so that a contaminant could be ruled out. In all, Taubenberger's team isolated nine fragments of viral RNA from five different genes. They decided to send their first publication to Nature, but the editors rejected the paper without even mailing it to experts for peer review. Science was sceptical too at first, but eventually published what amounted to about 15 percent of the haemagglutinin gene as well as small fragments of the four other genes on 21 March 1997. By the summer of 1997 the team had the full sequence of the haemagglutinin. At this point the problem arose that they had used up half the tissue available from Private Roscoe Vaughan for this one gene. It seemed most probable that all ten genes of the 1918 virus could not be sequenced from the available material. (In September 1997 tissue from a private called James Downs, who succumbed to influenza at Camp Upton, New York, turned out positive as well.)

Johan Hultin comes in 
The March paper in Science was also read by Johan Hultin. In 1951 the pathologist had already tried to isolate the 1918 influenza virus from victims, who had been buried in the Alaskan permafrost. At what was called Teller Mission at the time, he had unearthed bodies but had failed to find any live viruses. He never finished his thesis. Now, with PCR available, he realized the time had come to try again.

In July 1997 he offered Taubenberger to return to what is now Brevig, Alaska. Again he received permission to dig for victims of the 1918 Spanish flu, and this time he unearthed the remains of an obese woman, maybe thirty years old, whom he christened “Lucy”. The fat had protected her lungs from decay, and he took both of them. It turned out that in Lucy's case the fragments were even smaller – around 100 base pairs as compared to 150 in the case of Vaughan and Downs – but now there was enough material to sequence the complete 1918 virus many times over. Taubenberger and Reid managed to generate a complete haemagglutinin sequence to confirm the one they had got from Vaughan. In all three cases – Vaughan, Downs, and Lucy – the 1,800 base pairs differed only in a few places. This was the best confirmation that the sequence of the 1918 haemagglutinin had actually been found.

In a series of papers the team published the complete genome of the 1918 influenza virus. The work was funded by the Veteran's Administration and the Department of Defense. The completion of the genome in 2005 was numbered among the “breakthroughs of the year” by Science and was elected as "paper of the year" by Lancet .

Stranger than fiction 
Sometime in early 1998 Taubenberger received a manuscript from a novelist who had recently contacted him. Dr. Stephen Carter had discovered Taubenberger's work through the paper in Science, and he wanted to know whether Taubenberger would be interested in reading the first draft of a novel in which an ambitious vaccine biotechnology company known as Immunological Technologies resurrects the 1918 Spanish flu virus in secrecy in its state-of-the-art facility in San Diego, California. The book had taken almost three years to research and write, and Carter was looking for someone to critique the scientific elements. Jeffery Taubenberger seemed the perfect candidate.

To Carter's surprise Taubenberger agreed to read the hefty manuscript despite his workload. But it was not the scientific aspects of the story that Taubenberger responded to most strongly, it was the naval scenes set in the Pacific. Taubenberger thought that there were unresolved plot lines involving the naval carrier task force that played a central role in the escalating international conflicts in the book, later published as Ninth Day Of Creation. Carter relented and added a new section to the book involving a battle scene between a U.S. naval aircraft carrier and an advanced Chinese nuclear attack submarine.

Taubenberger then agreed to be interviewed by Carter about his ongoing work with the sequencing of the 1918 strain. Where was the research likely to lead, would the 1918 strain ultimately be reconstructed, and did Taubenberger have any reservations about publishing the gene sequences for a killer strain of flu? The interview was conducted and placed online in March 1998 as "An Interview With Dr. Jeffery Taubenberger".

Personal interests 
Jeffery Karl Taubenberger was born in the US Army hospital in Landstuhl but to a German father and US-born mother. His father Heinz Karl Taubenberger was a well-known figure skater in his youth, and was Germany's junior champion several times both in pair-skating and men's singles in the late 1940s and early 1950s.

In his free time Taubenberger is a woodwind player – oboe, English horn, clarinet; but his interest has mainly been composition. In 1981 he created his first opus, the operetta The Wayward Prince, lyrics with Andrew Russo. The overture was performed by the George Mason University Orchestra in July 1982 with Taubenberger as conductor. In 1984 he wrote a "Symphony in D minor", from which he performed two movements with the Richmond Community Orchestra in the same year with Taubenberger conducting. Further work includes two lieder for tenor and piano on poems by Goethe (1985-6), two woodwind quintets (1987& 1988), and a string quartet in G major (1990), which was performed the same year by Columbia String Ensemble and in 1995 again by the Gallery Quartet. Next came eight two-part inventions for solo piano (1994), a string quartet in E minor (1997), and "Daydreams", a symphonic tone poem for large orchestra (2000). He is currently working on a symphony in C major (since 2005) and a string quartet in B minor (2007). With work and family obligations he finds extremely little time for composing.

Taubenberger is married and has two children.

Taubenberger is a second cousin to former Philadelphia mayoral candidate Al Taubenberger.

References

Sources 

 Closing in on a Killer: Scientists Unlock Clues to the Spanish Influenza Virus (exhibit at National Museum of Health and Medicine, 1996)

American virologists
Influenza researchers
Medical College of Virginia alumni
1961 births
Living people